"Ella Es Mi Fiesta" ("She's My Party") is a song by Colombian recording artist Carlos Vives. It was released by Sony Music Latin as the third single for his fourteenth studio album Más + Corazón Profundo (2014) in October 21, 2014, and the lead single from his upcoming live album.

Charts

References 

2014 songs
2014 singles
Carlos Vives songs
Spanish-language songs
Sony Music Latin singles
Number-one singles in Colombia
Songs written by Carlos Vives
Songs written by Andrés Castro